Ian W. Archer FRHistS is a Fellow and Tutor in Modern History at Keble College, the University of Oxford.

Career 

After graduating from Altrincham Grammar School for Boys and Trinity College, Oxford,  Archer started his academic career in 1986 as a Research Fellow at Girton College, the University of Cambridge. In 1989 he moved to Downing College, Cambridge where he was Director of Studies in History until 1991. After leaving Cambridge he transferred to Keble College, Oxford where he is Sub-Warden.

Philanthropy 

He is the Chair of the Education Committee at the London Academy of Excellence Stratford, an Ofsted outstanding Free School.

Publications
The Pursuit of Stability: Social Relations in Elizabethan London. (Cambridge, 1991)
The History of the Haberdashers' Company. (Chichester, 1991)
"The Nostalgia of John Stow" in The Theatrical City: Culture, Theatre and Politics in London, 1576-1649. (Cambridge, 1995)
"The Burden of Taxation on Sixteenth-Century London", Historical Journal. Vol 44(3) (2001) pp. 599–627
"The Arts and Acts of Memorialization in Early Modern London 1598-1720" in Imagining Early Modern London: Perceptions and Portrayals of the City from Stow to Strype. (Cambridge, 2001) pp. 89–113
(2002)
"Religion, Politics, and Society in Sixteenth-Century England" in Camden Society. Vol Fifth Series, 22 (Cambridge, 2003) pp. xi +282
"John Stow, Citizen and Historian" in John Stow (1525-1605) and the Making of the English Past: Studies in Early Modern Culture and the History of the Book. (London, 2004) pp. 13–26
The Haberdashers' Company in the Later Twentieth Century. (Chichester, 2004) xiii + 178pp.
"Discourses of History in Elizabethan and Early Stuart London", Huntington Library Quarterly. Vol 68 Numbers 1 & 2 (2005) pp. 205–26

References

External links 
 Personal Website
 History Faculty Profile

20th-century British historians
21st-century British historians
Historians of England
Living people
Year of birth missing (living people)
Fellows of the Royal Historical Society